The sixth USS Ranger (SP-369) was a coastal minesweeper that served in the U.S. Navy from 1918 to 1919.

Ranger (SP-369) was a wooden motorboat built by T. A. Scott Company, New London, Connecticut, in 1882 and rebuilt in 1915. She was acquired by the U.S. Navy on charter on 10 September 1918 and commissioned on 11 September 1918 at Charleston, South Carolina.

Used briefly as a coastal minesweeper in the 6th Naval District during World War I, Ranger was struck from the Navy List and returned to her owner on 10 January 1919.

References

External links
 Photo gallery at navsource.org

Ships built in New London, Connecticut
1882 ships
World War I minesweepers of the United States
Minesweepers of the United States Navy